Luk Fook Holdings (International) Limited (六福集團(國際)有限公司) (Stock Code: 0590) principally engages in the sourcing, designing, wholesaling, trademark licensing and retailing of a variety of gold and platinum jewellery and gem-set jewellery. They were listed on the Main Board of The Stock Exchange of Hong Kong Limited in May 1997, and the Group has tapped into the mid to high-end watch market in recent years.

The Group’s revenue and gross profit for FY2016-17 reached approximately HK$12.807 billion and HK$3.277 billion respectively. As at Nov 2017, the market capitalisation of the group has reached over 20 billion.

Retail shops

As at May 2018, the Group had a total of over 1,640 shops in Hong Kong, Macau, Mainland China, Singapore, Malaysia, Cambodia, the United States, Canada and Australia.
Hong Kong: 48 shops
Mainland China: 1,570 shops across over 30 provinces since the establishment of the first shop in Mainland China in 1994
Macau: 10 shops located at Avenida de Almeida Ribeiro, Venetian Macao-Resort-Hotel, Galaxy Hotel, Sands Cotai Central, etc.
Singapore: 1 shop
Malaysia: 2 shops
Cambodia: 1 shop
United States: 4 shops 
Canada: 2 shops
Australia: 1 shop
Philippines: 3 shops

History

1991: Opened the first “Lukfook Jewellery” retail shop in North Point, Hong Kong. Miss Pauline Yeung was one of the shareholders.
1994: Opened the first retail shop in Guangdong Province, Mainland China.
1996: Set up "China Gems Laboratory Limited" in Hong Kong. The Laboratory passed the ISO 17025 in Jadeite Authentication, Diamond Testing and Gold Testing in 2005, 2009 and 2015 respectively. It also met the ISO 9001 Quality Management Systems Requirements.
1997: Listed on the Main Board of The Stock Exchange of Hong Kong Limited (Stock Code: 0590).
2000: Established the jewellery portal.
2001: Approximately 70 retail shops.
2002: Opened the first shop in Macau. Acquired a piece of land with a total area of 350,000 square feet in Panyu, Guangzhou to set up a jewellery processing plant in the "Luk Fook Jewellery Garden".
2003: Obtained the sole-proprietorship license in Mainland China. Opened the first retail shop in Canada.
2006: Established the first shop in the United States.
2010: Established the first shop in Singapore.
2011: Official opening of Luk Fook Jewellery Centre, headquarters of the Group, in Jordan, Hong Kong. Commencement of Phase II of the jewellery processing plant expansion works in the Luk Fook Jewellery Garden.
2012: Attained the Honour of “Retailer of The Year” in the “JNA Awards”. Listed in the “2012 Retail Asia-Pacific Top 500 Awards” and won the “Best-of-the-Best Retailers Award – Hong Kong”, organised by “Retail Asia”.
2013: “Lukfook” was recognised as a “Well-known Trademark” in Mainland China by the State administrative authorities. Established over 1,000 shops worldwide.
2014: Announce the acquisition of 50% interest in CGS.
2015: Entered into a three-year sightholder rough diamond sales contract with De Beers Group of Companies (“De Beers”), the world’s largest diamond producer by value and becoming one of the 84 sightholders of De Beers around the globe.
2015: Won “Hong Kong Top Service Brand Ten Year Achievement Award” in the “2015 Hong Kong Top Service Brand Awards”
2016: Lukfook Jewellery Expands into Malaysia with Grand Opening of Two Shops in Kuala Lumpur
2016: Grand Opening of the Second “Lukfook Jewellery” Shop in New York, the United States
2016: Lukfook Jewellery Open a Retail Outlet in Shinsegae Main Store in Seoul, Korea
2017: Grand Opening of the Second “Lukfook Jewellery” Shop in San Francisco, the United States
2018: Lukfook Jewellery at CF Markville in Canada was close temporarily after being robbed.

References

External links 

 Lukfook Jewellery

Jewellery companies of Hong Kong
Jewellery retailers of Hong Kong
Companies listed on the Hong Kong Stock Exchange
Hong Kong brands